Dry Bones is an Israeli political cartoon strip published in the English-language newspaper The Jerusalem Post since 1973. Dry Bones is the work of Yaakov Kirschen.

The name of the comic strip refers to the vision of the "Valley of Dry Bones" in the Book of Ezekiel (37:1–14).

Dry Bones has been reprinted and quoted by The New York Times, Time magazine, Los Angeles Times, CBS, AP and Forbes. It offers a pictorial commentary on current events in Israel and the Jewish world.  Dry Bones is syndicated in North America by Cagle Cartoons.

History
The main character of the cartoon is Shuldig - Yiddish for guilty/to blame.

During the aftermath of the Sabra and Shatila massacres, The New York Times published an article on Israeli perception of the event. 7.4% of the article was about Dry BonesWhen terrorists attacked from Syria, we blamed the Syrians. When murderous infiltrators slipped in from Lebanon, we blamed the Lebanese. When P.L.O. killers launched raids from Jordan, we blamed the Jordanians. When fedayeen goons came in from Egypt, we blamed the Egyptians. But when we send a bloodthirsty gang into a refugee camp, we blame everyone in the world except ourselves. Whether it was omission or commission, we've got something to atone for this Yom Kippur.

-Yaakov KirschenDry Bones has been characterized as generally pro-Israel, and has tried to spread awareness of the persecution of Christians in Africa and Syria.

Criticism 
The comic strip was criticised in an episode of the podcast Chapo Trap House for its alleged poor quality and racist undertones.

Yaakov Kirschen
Kirschen originally held a job in making greeting cards, but was eventually fired due to his "jocular" behaviour. He made cartoons for magazines such as Playboy and Cracked. In 1971 he moved to Israel, taking up cartooning. Kirschen did programming at IBM and two other major corporations by day, "while at the same time working as a cartoonist." In 1971 he "dragged a wife and three children" to "'return' to the land of Israel, a place that we had never even visited." In Israel, with four other computer programmers, he built an ELIZA-like Artificial Intelligence program, but with "personalities of a Jewish mother and a Jewish uncle, called Mom and Murray." He also began his Dry Bones series - the same combination of programming by day, cartoons in after hours.

After a 2019 cartoon in the New York Times depicting Benjamin Netanyahu as a guide dog leading Donald Trump (portrayed as a blind man) sparked controversy over perceived antisemitism, Kirschen criticized the cartoon, which he believed was using both anti-semitic tropes and a lack of creativity.

Kirschen has criticized the general field of political cartooning for condoning antisemitism. In an interview he gave the example of a cartoon by Dave Brown depicting Ariel Sharon as eating babies, which won several awards. Kirschen says his cartoons are designed to make people laugh, which makes them drop their guard and see things the way he does. In an interview, he defined his objective as a cartoonist as an attempt to "seduce rather than to offend."  Kirschen is opposed to the Boycott, Divestment and Sanctions movement and has criticized it in his cartoons. In 2015, he founded a virtual campus named the Dry Bones Academy of Cartoon Advocacy and Activism.

Awards
Kirschen won the Israeli Museum of Caricature and Comics' Golden Pencil Award for his work.

Books 
 Trees, the Green Testament (1993)
 The Dry Bones Haggadah (2016)
 Young and Innocent: The Way We Were (2017)

References

External links 
 Dry Bones homepage
 Dry Bones blog
 The Dry Bones Project
 Dry Bones comic strip

1973 comics debuts
American comic strips
Israeli comic strips
Gag-a-day comics
Bonei Zion Prize recipients
Satirical comics
Comics about politics